The Alternative Comedy Memorial Society (ACMS) is a British comedy night, where comedians are invited to perform sets that might not work at more mainstream comedy nights. It was founded by John-Luke Roberts and Thom Tuck at the New Red Lion Theatre in Islington, London. For a while it was mainly held at the Soho Theatre, but now the regular London venue is The Phoenix, Cavendish Square. Each year there are Alternative Comedy Memorial Society shows at the Edinburgh Fringe. ACMS has been running since March 2011, usually on Monday evenings. The group's logo is a boulder emblazoned with 'JOKE?' being pushed up a hill, representing the slogan 'Fresh Sysiphean Comedy'.

The show

The show is curated and hosted by John-Luke Roberts and Thom Tuck. There are a group of regular comedians, referred to as "The Board", including William Andrews, Steve Pretty, Tom Bell, Bridget Christie, Alexis Dubus, Nadia Kamil, Josie Long, Sara Pascoe, Isy Suttie and Ben Target. The ACMS has developed a number of in-jokes, such as a list of permitted heckles and a repeated call and response with the audience.

In December 2012, the "AXMS panto" debuted. This was loosely structured around a performance of Aladdin, and played with many pantomime conventions.

The show has been filmed as a series of Comedy Blaps for Channel 4, which were released in 2013. The series is produced by Adrian Sturges and directed by Chris Shepherd.

Participants

 Ed Aczel
 Tom Allen
 William Andrews
 Dan Antopolski
 Belinda Anderson-Hunt
 Dougie Baldwin
 Tom Basden
 Aisling Bea
 Tom Bell
 Bob and Jim
 Ali Brice
 Alfie Brown
 Michael Brunström
 Abigail Burdess
 Holly Burn
 Margaret Cabourn-Smith & Zoe Gardner
 Bridget Christie
 Matthew Crosby
 Paul Currie
 Eleanor Curry
 Sian Docksey
 Alexis Dubus
 Alex Edelman
 Kevin Eldon
 Pippa Evans
 John Henry Falle
 Deborah Frances-White
 Nick Helm
 Adam Hess
 Matthew Highton
 Bec Hill
 Harry Hill
 Wil Hodgson
 Amy Hoggart
 Tommy Holgate
 Colin Hoult
 Edy Hurst
 Robin Ince
 Elis James
 Sanderson Jones
 Jonny & The Baptists
 Phill Jupitus
 Nadia Kamil
 John Kearns
 Tim Key
 Adam Larter
 Marek Larwood
 Tony Law
 Michael Legge
 Cariad Lloyd
 Josie Long
 Al Lubel
 Joe Lycett
 Tom Mayhew
 David McIver
 John Paul McQue
 Garrett Millerick
 Eleanor Morton
 Simon Munnery
 Robert Newman
 Phil Nichol
 Joz Norris
 Andrew O'Neill
 Jon Oldfield
 Celia Pacquola
 Henry Paker
 Rachel Parris
 Benjamin Partridge
 Sara Pascoe
 Howard Read
 Adam Riches
 John Robertson
 Lou Sanders
 Terry Saunders
 Paul Savage
 Abigoliah Schamaun
 Karl Schultz
 Waen Shepherd
 Bob Slayer
 Rachel Stubbings
 Nick Sun
 Isy Suttie
 Paul Sweeney
 Ben Target
 Lorna Rose Treen
 Alison Thea-Skott
 Asher Treleaven
 David Trent
 Addy Van Der Borgh
 Holly Walsh
 Danielle Ward
 Martin White
 Joe Wilkinson
 Mike Wozniak
 Sharnema Nougar
 David Tieck

Impact

In The Guardian in 2014, Paul Merton described ACMS as somewhere audiences go to enjoy the art of comedy. In The Guardian in 2016, Simon Munnery described ACMS as keeping alternative comedy alive, even as they claim to memorialise it. In 2018 The British Comedy Guide referred to ACMS as a "mighty institution".

On the other hand, Stewart Lee has suggested that ACMS doesn't represent the working classes in the way that 1980s alternative comedy did, and in 2019 a speaker at the University of Kent's 'Alternative Comedy Now' conference questioned whether ACMS are the inheritors of the alternative comedy ethos, suggesting that the shows are too highbrow and exclusive.

See also

References

External links 
Official Alternative Comedy Memorial Website
Flickr set of photos of ACMS Season II

British comedy